Serafín Martínez del Rincón y Trives (1840, Palencia - 24 March 1892, Madrid) was a Spanish painter, known for his genre and history scenes and portraits.

Biography 

Encouraged by regional showings in Valladolid, which were well-received, in 1862 he participated in the National Exhibition of Fine Arts with a painting depicting "The Cid's oath in Santa Gadea". Two years later, he presented a Biblical scene showing the "Raising of Jairus' daughter", in hopes of winning a scholarship to Rome, but he was not successful. He had no more significant showings until 1878, when he received a third-class medal for his painting "An Excorcism", which was then sent to the Exposition Universelle in Paris. In 1881, the city of Málaga acquired his painting of the two lovers whose suicide inspired the name of a local landmark; the "Peña de los Enamorados" (Lovers' Rock).

In 1866, he was named a Professor at the Escuela de Bellas Artes in Cádiz.
 
That year, José Canalejas, the Minister of Development, proposed him as a candidate for the Grand Cross of the Order of Isabella the Catholic, which he was awarded in July. 

His only daughter died in July 1891, and he died the following March.

References

External links 

1840 births
1892 deaths
Spanish painters
Spanish genre painters
History painters
Real Academia de Bellas Artes de San Fernando alumni
People from Palencia